Volodymyr Petrovych Shkidchenko (born January 1, 1948, Chita, Zabaykalsky Krai, Russia) is a Ukrainian military officer, General of Army of Ukraine. Minister of Defence of Ukraine (November 12, 2001 — June 25, 2003).

External links 
 Biography

1948 births
Living people
People from Chita, Zabaykalsky Krai
Moscow Institute of Physics and Technology alumni
Generals of the Army (Ukraine)
Chiefs of the General Staff (Ukraine)
Defence ministers of Ukraine
Russian emigrants to Ukraine
Russian people of Ukrainian descent
Recipients of the Order of Bohdan Khmelnytsky, 3rd class
Recipients of the Order of Bohdan Khmelnytsky, 2nd class
Frunze Military Academy alumni
Military Academy of the General Staff of the Armed Forces of the Soviet Union alumni
Laureates of the State Prize of Ukraine in Science and Technology